"Love and Affection" is a song by Kittitian-English singer-songwriter Joan Armatrading. Her fourth single, and her third for A&M Records, it was her first chart success. It reached number 10 in the UK Singles Chart in November 1976. One of her best-known recordings, it has been described as a "deceptively feisty ballad ... an instant classic." It appeared on her eponymous third album. The song has twice been used as the title track of compilation albums, for 1999's Love and Affection: The Best of Joan Armatrading and 2003's Love and Affection: Classics 1975–1983.

The male backing vocal, which has been described as a "honeyed baritone", was performed by American actor and singer Clarke Peters. The alto saxophone was by Gallagher and Lyle session player Jimmy Jewell.

Personnel

Joan Armatrading – vocals, 6 & 12-string acoustic guitars
Jerry Donahue – acoustic & electric guitars
Jimmy Jewell – alto saxophone
Dave Markee – bass guitar
Dave Mattacks – drums
Leroy Champaign – backing vocals
Clarke Peters – backing vocals and "People"

Charts

Certifications

Sinitta version

In 1990 American singer Sinitta covered "Love and Affection". It was produced by Barry Anthony Andrews and released as a non-album single. The single peaked at number 62 in the UK.

Critical reception
David Giles from Music Week wrote, "Dance interpretation of the Joan Armatrading classic that works well, if only because it adapts the original rather more cleverly into dancefloor mode than the recent Loving You did. Enormous hit potential here."

Charts

Other cover versions
Sheena Easton covered "Love and Affection" on her 1984 platinum album A Private Heaven.
Martha Davis (of the Motels) and Sly Stone perform a duet of the song which appeared on the 1986 soundtrack for Soul Man.
Melissa Etheridge performed the song in 1996, live on the VH1 channel, with  Joan Osborne, Paula Cole, Jewel and a backing band.
Kate Ceberano recorded a version for her 1996 album Blue Box. It was released as the third single from that album.
The song was covered by Two Nice Girls in a medley with the Velvet Underground's "Sweet Jane" and later by Courtney Pine and Kele Le Roc.
Daley covered "Love and Affection" (retitled "Love + Affection") for his 2014 album Days & Nights.
Dutch singer Mathilde Santing covered the song on her album Under a Blue Roof (1994).

References

External links
"Love and Affection" lyrics from Joan Armatrading's official website

1976 singles
1976 songs
Joan Armatrading songs
1990 singles
Sinitta songs
Song recordings produced by Glyn Johns
Songs written by Joan Armatrading
Fanfare Records singles
A&M Records singles